Matthew Branton (born 1968) is a British novelist and author. He is noted for interrupting a successful career by publishing his fifth novel as a free download during the invasion of Iraq in 2003.

Life and career
Branton grew up in Sevenoaks, Kent and was educated at Sheffield City Polytechnic where as an undergraduate he was taught by the Montserratian poet, playwright, and novelist E A Markham, and as a postgraduate by the British novelist Lesley Glaister. His first novel The Love Parade was published in 1997; The House of Whacks in 1999; Coast in 2000; The Hired Gun in 2001. Non-fiction includes Write a Bestselling Thriller published in 2012.

Branton published his fifth novel The Tie and the Crest as a free download in April 2003, to protest UK involvement in the invasion of Iraq. His novels, though commercially successful, are understood to belong to the outsider-art and politically-radical creative traditions, as does his work since 2003, usually published unsigned and unpublicized, frequently via social media.

References

1968 births
Outsider artists
20th-century English novelists
21st-century English novelists
Living people
People from Sevenoaks
British male novelists
20th-century English male writers
21st-century English male writers